Gelati may refer to:

 Gelati Monastery, a medieval monastery in Georgia
 Plural of gelato, an Italian ice cream
 A layered parfait of water ice (a form of Italian ice) and frozen custard, popular in the Philadelphia metropolitan region
 Gelati (vessel), traditional vessels exhibited at Maritime Museum